Die Familie Hesselbach is a 1954 West German film about a lower middle class German family. It stars, and was written and directed by Wolf Schmidt and was based on a popular radio show.

It was followed by three sequels:
The Hesselbach Family on Vacation (1955)
The Horoscope of Family Hesselbach (Das Horoskop der Familie Hesselbach (1956)
Herr Hesselbach und die Firma (1956)

Production
Wolf Schmidt had made a successful radio series that ran from 1951 to 1958 but was unable to get finance for the film version so shot it in his own apartment in Friedberg.

Reception
The movie was a hit and the first post-war German film to gross over one million marks ($250,000). It led to three sequels and a television series which ran from 1960 until 1963.

References

External links
Die Familie Hesselbach at IMDB
  i
1954 in film